Michel-Celse-Roger de Bussy-Rabutin (1669 – 3 November 1736) was a French churchman and diplomat.

Biography
The second son of Count Roger de Bussy-Rabutin, he served as Bishop of Luçon from 1723 until his death. He attended the salon of Madame de Tencin; he was elected to the Académie française on 21 February 1732, without having written a single work, being sponsored into the French Academy by Fontenelle the following 6 March. In 1735 he commissioned a portrait of himself by Hyacinthe Rigaud without knowing how he would pay for it – the artist's accounting books state "Monsieur the Bishop of Luçon, Bussy-Rabutin. Remains half-finished.".

See also
 List of Ambassadors of France to the United Kingdom

References

External links
Académie française

1669 births
1736 deaths
Bishops of Luçon
French diplomats